Lorenzo Tucker (June 27, 1907 – August 19, 1986), known as the "Black Valentino," was an American stage and screen actor who played the romantic lead in the early black films of Oscar Micheaux.

Acting career
Born in Philadelphia, Tucker started acting at Temple University, where he was a student. Tucker also appeared early in his career with Bessie Smith on cross-country tours.

From 1926 to 1946, Tucker appeared in 18 of Micheaux's films, including When Men Betray (1928), Wages of Sin (1929), Easy Street (1930), Harlem Big Show, Veiled Aristocrats (1932), Ten Minutes to Live (1932), Harlem After Midnight (1934), Temptation (1935), and Underworld (1937). He became known as the "Black Valentino" because of his good looks and role as the romantic lead in the early black cinema. Tucker noted the irony of the appellation because he believed Rudolph Valentino had a darker complexion than Tucker. He became a movie star to black America and often was mentioned in the leading black newspapers. One of Micheaux and Tucker's more controversial films was Veiled Aristocrats, where Tucker played a black man who passed as white and tried to persuade his sister to pass for white. He also made an cameo appearance with Paul Robeson in 1933's The Emperor Jones.

Tucker was also a successful stage actor, appearing on Broadway in The Constant Sinner, Ol' Man Satan, and Humming Sam. His most controversial role came in The Constant Sinner in which he portrayed the pimp Money Johnson and in which Mae West was his prostitute Babe Gordon. Although miscegenation was outlawed in some parts of the Southern U.S., the play included a scene in which Tucker kissed West. When the play opened in Washington, D.C., the press was outraged to see a black man kissing a white woman, and demands were made that the scene be excised from the play. West rejected demands, and the play left Washington. The Shuberts refused to permit Tucker to play the role, and white actor George Givot was hired to play the role wearing blackface. Despite the Shuberts' decision, West cast Tucker in a few minor parts, including the role of a Spaniard who walks across the stage. When a woman asks West's character who that is, West responded "Oh, he's Spanish — he's my Spanish fly!"

Later years
During World War II, Tucker was a tail gunner in the U.S. Army Air Corps. After the war, Tucker appeared in Louis Jordan's film Reet, Petite and Gone; in the early 1950s, he returned to the stage appearing in a London production of Anna Lucasta.

Tucker later became an autopsy technician for the New York City medical examiner, where he worked on the bodies of Malcolm X and Nina Mae McKinney.
Tucker moved to Hollywood permanently in 1977, where he continued to seek work. He took the nighttime security guard job, he said, so his days would be free for interviews.
Tucker died of lung cancer at age 79 at his home in Hollywood, California. He left a widow, Pauline Segura Tucker. His funeral took place at Blessed Sacrament Catholic Church in Hollywood, California.

Honors and awards
In 1974, Tucker was inducted into the Black Film Makers Hall of Fame, and he received the Audelco Recognition Award in 1981. On an episode of The Cosby Show, titled "Denise Drives", Clair Huxtable quizzes Denise Huxtable on car safety asking if she should stop her car for a stranger on a dark rainy night with "hair like Lorenzo Tucker, eyes like Billy Dee and a smile like Nat King Cole."

References

Bibliography
 Richard Grupenhoff. The Black Valentino: The Stage and Screen Career of Lorenzo Tucker. Metuchen, NJ: Scarecrow Press, 1988.

External links

1907 births
1986 deaths
African-American male actors
American male film actors
American male silent film actors
Deaths from lung cancer in California
Male actors from Philadelphia
Temple University alumni
Burials at Riverside National Cemetery
20th-century American male actors
African-American Catholics
20th-century African-American people